Associazione Calcio Milan did not manage to repeat their successful previous season (1998–99). They failed to defend the Serie A title, finishing in 3rd place behind champions Lazio and runners-up Juventus, and crashed out of the Champions League following a lackluster performance in the First Group Phase. In fact, Milan ended up last in the group, and did not even qualify for the remainder of the UEFA Cup.

New signing Andriy Shevchenko played his first season with the Milanese club, and managed to become the Serie A's top scorer in his debut season in Italy, with 24 goals (29 in all competitions), further enhancing his reputation as a fearsome striker. Other signings proven to be successful were Serginho and Gennaro Gattuso, who would stay at the club for years to come and be eventually introduced into the club's hall of fame.

Players

Squad information

Left club during the season

Transfers

Winter

Reserves

Competitions

Supercoppa Italiana

Serie A

League table

Results by round

Matches

Coppa Italia

Eightfinals

Quarterfinals

UEFA Champions League

Group stage

Statistics

Players statistics

|}

Goalscorers
  Andriy Shevchenko 24
  Oliver Bierhoff 11
  Zvonimir Boban 5
  Leonardo 4
  George Weah 3

References

A.C. Milan seasons
Milan